The Eastern Anatolia Development Programme is an integrative development programme financed by the European Structural Funds for the east of Turkey.

Notes

References 

Economy of Turkey